The Ford Mondeo Mk V (fourth generation), also known as the Ford Fusion, codenamed CD391, was unveiled by Ford at the 2012 North American International Auto Show in Detroit, Michigan.

With a design team based in Detroit for the planning and global launch phase, the new model takes many styling cues from the previous generation Ford Mondeo, and previous generation American Ford Fusion. 

Like the newest redesigns of the Focus and Fiesta before it, the new Mondeo is set on a global platform shared with the now-identical Fusion sold in North America. However, the Fusion name was used in South Africa, despite the Mondeo having been previously sold in that country.

Overview
At the 2012 Paris Motor Show, Ford confirmed product details, and delayed the European launch from early summer 2013 to late autumn 2014 to address quality issues in ramping up production of the fourth-generation Mondeo receiving updates.  It was later explained that European sales of the latest Mondeo would be delayed by "at least a year" because of the closure in 2013 of the Ford plant at Genk, which is where previous generations of the car had been produced for the European markets.

The smaller three-cylinder "Econetic" 125-PS unit was scheduled for 2015 and there was also talk of a four-wheel-drive version scheduled for a future date. 

Since 2018, the 1.5L EcoBoost engine has a maximum output power of 165-PS.

The car is available with Dynamic LED headlamps. Also, a first in its class, is the introduction of a Rear Inflatable Seatbelt to reduce the pressure on the occupant's body in the event of a crash.

For the Australian market, the Mondeo line-up for 2020 has been reduced to only the base Ambiente, with added active safety features from prior high-grade variants, and larger alloy wheels. This is before the Mondeo will be completely discontinued in Australia in mid-2020.

Ford initially denied rumours of ending production of the Mondeo and the closely related S-Max and Galaxy MPVs in Europe, but in March 2021 the company announced that it will discontinue the production of the Mondeo in Europe and Argentina with no direct successor. Production of the Mondeo ended in Europe with the final car that was completed on 30 March 2022. The car was painted grey and it rolled off the production line at the Valencia plant on 4 April 2022.

Powertrain
The range does not include five- or six-cylinder engines, and on launch will have a complete range of Ford EcoBoost engines. From September 2013, Ford added a three-cylinder 123-bhp Ecoboost, claimed to produce 125 g/km of CO2 emissions. In 2014, a hybrid equipped with a lithium-ion battery pack and a 185-bhp Atkinson cycle 2.0-litre petrol engine was added.

References

External links

 Ford Mondeo (Britain)
 Ford Mondeo (Ireland)
 Ford Fusion (USA)
 Ford Fusion (Canada)

4th
Euro NCAP large family cars
Front-wheel-drive vehicles
All-wheel-drive vehicles
Hatchbacks
Sedans
Station wagons
Cars introduced in 2014
2010s cars